is a Japanese-language song by Aya Kamiki, written by Koshi Inaba, Tak Matsumoto and was Kimiki's second single, released on April 12, 2006. The song is no relation to the 1983 song of the same name by Toshihiko Tahara, and begins with the lyrics "Momoiro ni somari yuku..".

"Pierrot" was used as the theme song for the film Hokuto no Ken - Raō Den - Jun'ai no Shō. The main track is a cover version of a B'z song released as the coupling track of their single "Yuruginai Mono Hitotsu", which was released on the same day as Kamiki's single. This single debuted at #9 on the Oricon Weekly Singles Chart and sold 38,127 copies in total. This is currently her second best selling single.

Track list

CD 
 
 
  (instrumental)

Sales
Initial week estimate: 9,774  
Total estimate: 38,127

References 
GIZA studio (2006), Aya Kamiki Official Web Site
Oricon Style (2006), Oricon Profile

B'z songs
Aya Kamiki songs
2006 singles
Songs written by Koshi Inaba
Songs written by Tak Matsumoto
Japanese film songs
Songs written for animated films
Songs about fictional male characters